Waddington is a small village located in the Selwyn District of the Canterbury region of New Zealand's South Island, near the Waimakariri Gorge.

Description
Waddington was named by and for William Waddington, who purchased part of the Homebush run that had previously been held by John Deans, and laid out the township in 1873.

Waddington has a close association with its neighbouring village Sheffield, which is  further north-west along State Highway 73. The two villages share a community committee.

The two villages are located between Darfield and Springfield on both State Highway 73 and the Midland Line railway. The towns were settled in the 19th century by farmers attracted to the area because of its suitability for sheep grazing.

Waddington is situated at the intersection of three major roads (two of them popular tourist roads) that service the inland regions of Canterbury, including the Inland Scenic Route and the Great Alpine Highway / State Highway 73.

Waddington's cemetery was initially called the East Malvern Cemetery, but in 1880 the trust changed its name to Waddington Cemetery Trust. Its first burial was in 1882.

Waddington is also home to the St John Youth/Cadets South Island Region Camp.

Demographics
Sheffield and Waddington are described by Statistics New Zealand as a rural settlement. It is part of the statistical area of Torlesse.

Waddington had a population of 132 at the 2018 New Zealand census, an increase of 9 people (7.3%) since the 2013 census, and an increase of 9 people (7.3%) since the 2006 census. There were 51 households. There were 69 males and 63 females, giving a sex ratio of 1.1 males per female. The median age was 42.1 years (compared with 37.4 years nationally), with 27 people (20.5%) aged under 15 years, 18 (13.6%) aged 15 to 29, 63 (47.7%) aged 30 to 64, and 24 (18.2%) aged 65 or older.

Ethnicities were 93.2% European/Pākehā, 18.2% Māori, 2.3% Pacific peoples, 4.5% Asian, and 4.5% other ethnicities (totals add to more than 100% since people could identify with multiple ethnicities).

Although some people objected to giving their religion, 43.2% had no religion, and 36.4% were Christian.

Of those at least 15 years old, 18 (17.1%) people had a bachelor or higher degree, and 21 (20.0%) people had no formal qualifications. The median income was $23,500, compared with $31,800 nationally. The employment status of those at least 15 was that 45 (42.9%) people were employed full-time, 24 (22.9%) were part-time, and 6 (5.7%) were unemployed.

References

Selwyn District
Populated places in Canterbury, New Zealand